Ernest Ridley Anderson (December 9, 1898 – January 18, 1977) was a Canadian professional ice hockey player. He played with the Regina Capitals, Calgary Tigers, and Edmonton Eskimos of the Western Canada Hockey League. He also played in the American Hockey Association with Minneapolis and Duluth.

References

External links

1898 births
1977 deaths
Calgary Tigers players
Canadian ice hockey right wingers
Edmonton Eskimos (ice hockey) players
Ice hockey people from Manitoba
Regina Capitals players